Thomas James Lees (16 June 1858 – 11 July 1947) was an Australian boxer and the second reported person to hold the title Heavyweight Champion of Australia, from May 1885 to September 1886.

During a long career in boxing he fought bouts in South Africa, USA, Canada and the UK as well as in Australasia. "He won and held the Australian championship against some of the best men in the world," including such famous heavyweight boxers as Peter Jackson, Joe Goddard and Bob Fitzsimmons. His record comes to: 16 wins (9 by knockout), 10 losses, 5 draws and 13 no decisions.

Professional boxing record

| style="text-align:center;" colspan="8"|17 Wins (10 Knockouts), 12 Defeats (3 Knockouts), 5 Draws, 14 No Contests
|-  style="text-align:center; background:#e3e3e3;"
|  style="border-style:none none solid solid; "|Res.
|  style="border-style:none none solid solid; "|Record
|  style="border-style:none none solid solid; "|Opponent
|  style="border-style:none none solid solid; "|Type
|  style="border-style:none none solid solid; "|Rd., Time
|  style="border-style:none none solid solid; "|Date
|  style="border-style:none none solid solid; "|Location
|  style="border-style:none none solid solid; "|Notes
|- align=center
|style="background:#ddd;"|NC
|1-0-1
|align=left|Australia Peter Jackson
|
|6
|
|align=left|
|align=left|
|- align=center
|Loss
|
|align=left|Australia George Seale
|
|6
|
|align=left|
|align=left|
|- align=center
|Loss
|2-0-1
|align=left|Australia Peter Jackson
|
|4
|
|align=left|
|align=left|
|- align=center
|style="background:#ddd;"|NC
|3-0-1
|align=left|Australia Peter Jackson
|
|4
|
|align=left|
|align=left|
|- align=center
|Win
|
|align=left|Australia S. Cribbe
|
|6
|
|align=left|
|align=left|
|- align=center
|style="background:#ddd;"|NC
|
|align=left|Australia Key
|
|3
|
|align=left|
|align=left|
|- align=center
|Win
|
|align=left|Australia O'Brien
|
|2
|
|align=left|
|align=left|
|- align=center
|Win
|0-2-1
|align=left|Australia Dick Atkinson
|
|11
|
|align=left|
|align=left|
|- align=center
|style="background:#abcdef;"|Draw
|7-0-1
|align=left|Australia Bill Farnan
|
|3
|
|align=left|
|align=left|
|- align=center
|Win
|7-0-2
|align=left|Australia Bill Farnan
|
|12
|
|align=left|
|align=left|Australian heavyweight title
|- align=center
|style="background:#ddd;"|NC
|7-1-4
|align=left|Australia Peter Newton
|
|3
|
|align=left|
|align=left|
|- align=center
|style="background:#ddd;"|NC
|7-1-4
|align=left|Australia Peter Newton
|
|4
|
|align=left|
|align=left|
|- align=center
|style="background:#abcdef;"|Draw
|8-1-2
|align=left|Australia Bill Farnan
|
|19
|
|align=left|
|align=left|Australian heavyweight title
|- align=center
|Win
|8-1-3
|align=left|Australia Bill Farnan
|
|4
|
|align=left|
|align=left|Australian heavyweight title
|- align=center
|style="background:#ddd;"|NC
|7-1-4
|align=left|Australia Peter Newton
|
|4
|
|align=left|
|align=left|
|- align=center
|style="background:#ddd;"|NC
|3-3-3
|align=left|Australia Pablo Fanque
|
|4
|
|align=left|
|align=left|
|- align=center
|style="background:#ddd;"|NC
|6-0-1
|align=left|Australia Larry Foley
|
|4
|
|align=left|
|align=left|
|- align=center
|Win
|
|align=left|Astralia Jack Malloy
|
|2
|
|align=left|
|align=left|
|- align=center
|style="background:#ddd;"|NC
|7-1-4
|align=left|Australia Peter Newton
|
|4
|
|align=left|
|align=left|
|- align=center
|style="background:#abcdef;"|Draw
|7-1-4
|align=left|Australia Peter Newton
|
|4
|
|align=left|
|align=left|
|- align=center
|style="background:#ddd;"|NC
|4-3-0
|align=left|Australia George Seale
|
|4
|
|align=left|
|align=left|
|- align=center
|Win
|
|align=left|Australia Maori Jack
|
|2
|
|align=left|
|align=left|
|- align=center
|Win
|4-1-0
|align=left|Australia Bob Fitzsimmons
|
|4
|
|align=left|
|align=left|
|- align=center
|Win
|10-1-0
|align=left|Australia Mick Dooley
|
|4
|
|align=left|
|align=left|
|- align=center
|Win
|0-1-0
|align=left|Australia Snow
|
|4
|
|align=left|
|align=left|
|- align=center
|Win
|
|align=left|Australia Big Jack
|
|4
|
|align=left|
|align=left|
|- align=center
|style="background:#ddd;"|NC
|7-1-4
|align=left|Australia Peter Newton
|
|4
|
|align=left|
|align=left|
|- align=center
|Loss
|4-2-2
|align=left|Australia Peter Jackson
|
|30
|
|align=left|
|align=left|Australian heavyweight title
|- align=center
|Win
|
|align=left|United Kingdom Will Perkins
|
|6
|
|align=left|
|align=left|
|- align=center
|Loss
|2-1-2
|align=left|United Kingdom Bill Chesterfield Goode
|
|15
|
|align=left|
|align=left|
|- align=center
|Win
|3-1-2
|align=left|United Kingdom Bill Chesterfield Goode
|
|5
|
|align=left|
|align=left|
|- align=center
|Loss
|31-3-7
|align=left|USA Jack Fallon
|
|10
|
|align=left|
|align=left|
|- align=center
|Loss
|32-3-7
|align=left|USA Jack Fallon
|
|8
|
|align=left|
|align=left|
|- align=center
|Loss
|8-1-0
|align=left|USA Joe McAuliffe
|
|8
|
|align=left|
|align=left|
|- align=center
|style="background:#ddd;"|NC
|13-3-2
|align=left|USA Peter Jackson
|
|4
|
|align=left|
|align=left|
|- align=center
|style="background:#ddd;"|NC
|15-3-2
|align=left|USA Peter Jackson
|
|4
|
|align=left|
|align=left|
|- align=center
|Win
|
|align=left|USA Billy McCullom
|
|3
|
|align=left|
|align=left|
|- align=center
|Win
|
|align=left|Australia Harry Walker
|
|6
|
|align=left|
|align=left|
|- align=center
|Loss
|15-1-2
|align=left|Australia Joe Goddard
|
|9
|
|align=left|
|align=left|
|- align=center
|style="background:#abcdef;"|Draw
|17-1-2
|align=left|Australia Joe Goddard
|
|8
|
|align=left|
|align=left|
|- align=center
|style="background:#abcdef;"|Draw
|1-2-2
|align=left|Australia Herb McKell
|
|6
|
|align=left|
|align=left|
|- align=center
|Win
|
|align=left|South Africa Max Rossini
|
|1
|
|align=left|
|align=left|
|- align=center
|Loss
|37-10-6
|align=left|Canada Frank Slavin
|
|20
|
|align=left|
|align=left|
|- align=center
|Loss
|1-0-0
|align=left|United Kingdom Jack Scales
|
|2
|
|align=left|
|align=left|
|- align=center
|Loss
|
|align=left|United Kingdom Harry Newmier
|
|6
|
|align=left|
|align=left|
|- align=center
|Loss
|
|align=left|United Kingdom Sailor Bill Evarts
|
|8
|
|align=left|
|align=left|
|- align=center
|Win
|
|align=left|New Zealand Alfred O'Brien
|
|2
|
|align=left|
|align=left|
|- align=center
|style="background:#ddd;"|NC
|
|align=left|Canada Tommy Burns
|
|3
|
|align=left|
|align=left|
|- align=center

References

1858 births
1947 deaths
Heavyweight boxers
Australian male boxers
People from Tamworth, New South Wales
Sportsmen from New South Wales